Sabatinca lucilia is a species of moth in the family Micropterigidae. It is endemic to New Zealand and is found in the top half of the North Island. The adults of this species are on the wing from the end of November until the beginning of March. The larvae of this species likely feed on foliose liverwort species with the adults likely feeding on fern spores or sedge pollen. Adults have been found on a sunny moss-covered clay bank. The species can be found in multiple forest types such as kauri, kanuka and Nothofagus and prefers to inhabit damp fern covered banks

Taxonomy 
This species was described by Charles Edwin Clarke in 1920 using a specimen collected via electric light at Waitomo Hotel and another collected at Kauri Gully in Auckland. The latter specimen was designated by George Gibbs as the lectotype specimen and is held at the Auckland War Memorial Museum.

Description

Clarke described the species as follows:

In 1923 Alfred Philpott studied the wing venation of species within the Sabatinca genus and split the species in the genus into three groups. One of the groups contained S. lucilia and S. calliarcha.

Distribution 
This species is endemic to New Zealand. This species is found in the top half of the North Island.

Behaviour
The adults of this species are on the wing from the end of November until the beginning of March.

Hosts and habitat 
The larvae of this species likely feed on foliose liverwort species with the adults likely feeding on fern spores or sedge pollen. Adults have been found on a sunny moss-covered clay bank. The species can be found in multiple forest types such as kauri, kanuka and Nothofagus and prefers to inhabit damp fern covered banks.

References

Micropterigidae
Moths described in 1920
Endemic fauna of New Zealand
Moths of New Zealand
Endemic moths of New Zealand